The John and Kate Dougherty Farmstead is a farmstead located in Duvall, Washington, United States, listed on the National Register of Historic Places.

See also
 National Register of Historic Places listings in King County, Washington

References

1888 establishments in Washington Territory
Farms on the National Register of Historic Places in Washington (state)
Houses completed in 1888
Houses in King County, Washington
National Register of Historic Places in King County, Washington